The Los Teques Metro is a suburban mass-transit system in the city of Los Teques, Venezuela with connections to important surrounding cities and communities.  It was opened to public service on November 3, 2006. The Los Teques Metro currently operates one service (branded as lines 1 and 2 for the two parts of the system) connecting 5 stations, with additional stations for Line 2 under construction.

The system connects the city of Los Teques with the capital city of Caracas. The Los Teques Metro is operated by Metro de Caracas – as such, it is effectively a subsidiary/extension of the Caracas Metro, and is widely viewed as part of that system.  It is ascribed to the Venezuelan government and the Ministry of Infrastructure.  The government of Miranda State and the mayorship of the Guaicaipuro Municipality are also financing its development.

History 

The subway plans date back to 1982 when it was first proposed. However, it wouldn't be until October 19, 1998 when the Metro de Los Teques transit corporation was created (now defunct) in order to carry out management, administrative duties and civil works related to the project. It was supposed to alleviate the congestion of the Panamerican Highway and ease commuting between the two cities, because of their proximity. The operation was subsequently taken over by Metro de Caracas and plans were extended to include expansion to San Antonio and a 3rd line to connect to 2nd point in Caracas.

Construction for the first phase began in 2001 with works including the canalization of the San Pedro River, the tunneling and building of the bridges until reaching Las Adjuntas.  It is estimated that the project cost was about 800 million US dollars.

The metro system began with restricted operations:

2 railways through a single tunnel;
2 or 3 trains;
Daily service between 5:20 a.m and 11:00 p.m

Operations 

The second rail within the same tunnel was formally inaugurated October 22, 2007. Trial and testing period continued with additional trains and full 7 day service from 5:10 a.m. until 11:00 p.m. implemented on November 19, 2007. 

The  ride between Las Adjuntas and Independencia  is 4,00 bolívares Bs.F for a one way ride and the price includes a subway ride within the Caracas Metro network.

Los Teques Metro was provided with an integrated operation control centre, command and communications by Thales.

Future plans 

Construction of the extension formally started March 20, 2007. This extension known as Line 2 to the system will be  with 3 new stations within the city, 2 in nearby communities and finally terminating in San Antonio de Los Altos with the central Los Teques stations.

Line 4 adds four stations that are currently under construction are: 

 Los Cerritos, inauguration TBA
 Carrizal, inauguration TBA
 Las Minas, inauguration TBA
 San Antonio, inauguration TBA

Line 3 has been proposed . It will commence from San Antonio and connect some communities before looping towards the La Rinconada Caracas Metro Station.

 La Morita
 San Diego
 Potrerito
 La Mariposa
 La Rinconada

Timeline of line extensions

See also 
 Caracas Metro
 Maracaibo Metro
 Valencia Metro
 List of rapid transit systems
 Transportation in Venezuela
 IAFE Venezuelan National Railway

References

External links 
 Metro Los Teques - Official website  

2006 establishments in Venezuela
Los Teques
Buildings and structures in Miranda (state)

Railway lines opened in 2006
Rapid transit in Venezuela
Underground rapid transit in Venezuela